Cawongla is a locality in the Northern Rivers region of New South Wales, Australia. At the 2011 census, Cawongla had a population of 221.

The name "Cawongla" is a portmanteau of "Campbell"—the first European settler in the area—and "wonga" an Aboriginal word for "hill". Italian migrants once grew bananas in the area.  The locality today is a mix of traditional farming and alternative lifestyle communities.

Further reading

References

Towns in New South Wales
Kyogle Council